Georgios Balarjishvili (born 23 September 2002) is a Cypriot Judoka.

Balarjishvili won gold in the Judo at the 2022 Commonwealth Games – Men's 66 kg. Cyprus' first ever Commonwealth Games gold medal in the sport of judo after defeating Finlay Allan in the gold medal match. He was also, at the age of nineteen, the second youngest winner ever beheind Craig Fallon in 2002. Prior to the Commonwealth Games, Balarjishvili had claimed a bronze medal at the Junior European Cup in Athens in 2022.

References

External links
 
 
 

2002 births
Living people
Cypriot male judoka
Commonwealth Games medallists in judo
Judoka at the 2022 Commonwealth Games
Commonwealth Games gold medallists for Cyprus
21st-century Cypriot people
Judoka at the 2018 Summer Youth Olympics
Medallists at the 2022 Commonwealth Games